The intermediate roundleaf bat (Hipposideros larvatus) is a species of bat in the family Hipposideridae. It is found in Bangladesh, Cambodia, China, India, Indonesia, Laos, Malaysia, Myanmar, Thailand, and Vietnam.

References

External links
Sound recordings of Hipposideros larvatus on BioAcoustica

Hipposideros
Bats of Asia
Bats of South Asia
Bats of Southeast Asia
Bats of India
Bats of Indonesia
Bats of Malaysia
Mammals of Borneo
Mammals of Myanmar
Mammals of Bangladesh
Mammals of Cambodia
Mammals of China
Mammals of Laos
Mammals of Nepal
Mammals of the Philippines
Mammals of Thailand
Mammals of Vietnam
Mammals described in 1823
Taxa named by Thomas Horsfield
Taxonomy articles created by Polbot